Cham-e Dar Balut (also Romanized as Cham-e Dār Balūţ; also known as Dār Balūţ) is a village in Rudbar Rural District, Central District, Sirvan County, Ilam Province, Iran. At the 2006 census, its population was 104, in 22 families. The village is populated by Arabs.

References 

Populated places in Sirvan County
Arab settlements in llam Province